is the 19th single by Japanese band Dream, released on March 2, 2005. It is the last single released on the Avex Trax label, their third single as a 7-member group, and the last before changing their name to DRM. First pressings of its CD-only edition included one of three stickers. The limited edition came in a special package and included a mini booklet. The promotional video for the first of its double A-sides was included on its CD+DVD edition.

Track list
 Soyokaze no Shirabe (そよ風の調べ; Melody of the Gentle Breeze)
 Soyokaze no Shirabe (Instrumental)

DVD track list
 Soyokaze no Shirabe (promo video)

Credits
 Lyrics: 3-2-6
 Music: H-wonder
 Arrangement: H-wonder

External links
 http://www.oricon.co.jp/music/release/d/583685/1/
 http://www.oricon.co.jp/music/release/d/583683/1/
 http://www.oricon.co.jp/music/release/d/583684/1/

2005 singles
Dream (Japanese group) songs
2005 songs